Thompson Creek is a stream in Siskiyou County, California, which is a tributary to the Klamath River.

References

Rivers of Siskiyou County, California